Magnetic Man is an English electronic music project from London, consisting of dubstep producers and DJs Benga, Skream and Artwork (previously known as Menta). The trio first met in the late 1990s at the Big Apple Records store in Croydon. They performed using three computers, one playing drum samples, one playing basses and the third playing leads and other samples. Artwork controlled the master laptop, to which the other two are synchronised via MIDI. Their sets usually consisted of a mix of original tracks produced together, and live remixes of Benga and Skream's tracks, accompanied by synchronised projected visuals by Novak Collective. They signed to Columbia Records in 2010. Magnetic Man completed their first full-length sellout tour on 5 November 2010. Their self-titled debut studio album, Magnetic Man, was released through Sony by Columbia Records on 10 October 2010.

Discography

Albums

Extended plays

Singles

Other charted songs

Produced songs

Written songs

Other songs

References

External links 

 
 

English electronic music groups
British musical trios
Musical groups from London
Dubstep music groups
Columbia Records artists